This is a list of mayors of Welland, Ontario, from its incorporation in 1858 to the present day.

To date, three former mayors of the city have gone on to represent the city at the provincial or federal levels. Marshall Vaughan and Cindy Forster have represented the city as MPPs in the Legislative Assembly of Ontario, and Allan Pietz has represented the city as an MP in the House of Commons of Canada.

City of Welland (1917-present)
Welland was reincorporated as a city in 1917.

 Marshall Vaughan, 1917–18
 A.J.J. Brennan, 1919
 George Sutherland, 1920
 J.C. Diffin, 1921
 Jas Hughes, 1922–24
 F.J. Anderson, 1925–28
 F.M. Brown, 1929–30
 F.J. Bradley, 1931–32
 Frank Springer, 1933–35
 Norman Michener, 1936–37
 John Joyce, 1938–39
 T.H. Lewis, 1940–45
 H.W. Walker, 1946–47
 Harry W. Diffin, 1948–50
 David Thomas, 1951–52
 Armour McCrae, 1953–58
 G.J. Macoomb, 1958–60
 Michael Perenack, 1961–64
 Allan Pietz, 1965–78
 Eugene Stranges, 1979–84
 Roland Hardy, 1985–91
 Dick Reuter, 1991–2000
 Cindy Forster, 2000–03
 Damian Goulborne, 2003–10
 Barry Sharpe, 2010–14
 Frank Campion, 2014–present

References

External links
City of Welland Website: Mayors of Welland

Welland